INS Vidyut (K83) (Lightning)  was the lead vessel of her class of fast attack craft of the Indian Navy.

References

Vidyut-class missile boats
Fast attack craft of the Indian Navy